NGC 1300 is a barred spiral galaxy located about 61 million light-years away in the constellation Eridanus. The galaxy is about 110,000 light-years across. It is a member of the Eridanus Cluster, a cluster of 200 galaxies. It was discovered by John Herschel in 1835.

Nucleus 
In the core of the larger spiral structure of NGC 1300, the nucleus shows a "grand-design" spiral structure that is about 3,300 light-years long. Only galaxies with large-scale bars appear to have these grand-design inner disks — a spiral within a spiral. Models suggest that the gas in a bar can be funneled inwards, and then spiral into the center through the grand-design disk, where it can potentially fuel a central supermassive black hole (SMBH). NGC 1300 is not known to have an active nucleus, indicating that its central black hole is not accreting matter.

At least one supernova has been observed in NGC 1300: SN 2022acko (type IIP, mag. 15.8).

See also
NGC 1672, a similar spiral galaxy
NGC 7479, a galaxy with a very similar structure and both size and morphology similar
NGC 1232, a nearby intermediate spiral galaxy

References

External links

HST:  Barred Spiral Galaxy NGC 1300
Hubble Heritage

NGC 1300 in Eridanus

Barred spiral galaxies
Eridanus Group
Eridanus (constellation)
1300
12412
UGCA objects